Zalesie  is a village in the administrative district of Gmina Ryki, within Ryki County, Lublin Voivodeship, in eastern Poland.

The village has an approximate population of 350.

References

Zalesie